Robin Jill Bernheim (a.k.a. Robin Burger) is an American television producer and writer, as well as a story editor and creative consultant.

Career 

Bernheim was born in Santa Monica, California, and is a graduate of Stanford University and UCLA, where she received her MBA. She broke into television by submitting a spec script to Remington Steele, which starred Stephanie Zimbalist, her friend since childhood. Executive producer Michael Gleason then hired Bernheim on staff, leading to her career as one of the few women writing & producing hour-long, network television dramas in the 1980s and 1990s, including shows like Quantum Leap, Crazy Like a Fox, Houston Knights, MacGyver, Renegade and Tekwar. One of her Star Trek:Voyager episodes was chosen in 2020 by The Hollywood Reporter as one of the most memorable in the series' history 

Her work also includes several forays into animation, writing episodes of the Men In Black: The Series and Extreme Ghostbusters cartoons. In 2015, she co-produced and wrote the acclaimed PBS documentary feature Little House On The Prairie: The Legacy of Laura Ingalls Wilder. She was the executive producer of the hit Hallmark series When Calls the Heart from 2015 to 2018, the writer-producer of several Hallmark movies (including I'll Be Home For Christmas and Royal Hearts)  and in 2019 co-wrote & co-created the network's Mystery 101 series of movies with Lee Goldberg. Most recently, Bernheim co-wrote and co-produced the 2019 Netflix movie The Princess Switch starring Vanessa Hudgens, as well as a sequel, The Princess Switch: Switched Again, that will be released for Christmas 2020

Personal life
Bernheim lives in Encino, California, with her husband David Burger and her daughter Katherine. Her brother is Douglas Bernheim, currently the Edward Ames Edmunds Professor of Economics at Stanford University.

Filmography

References

External links
 

1956 births
Living people
Television producers from California
American women television writers
Writers from Los Angeles
American women television producers
21st-century American women